Orthophytum duartei is a plant species in the genus Orthophytum.

The bromeliad is endemic to the Atlantic Forest biome (Mata Atlantica Brasileira), located in southeastern Brazil.  It is native within the states of Espírito Santo and Minas Gerais.

References

duartei
Endemic flora of Brazil
Flora of the Atlantic Forest
Flora of Espírito Santo
Flora of Minas Gerais
Critically endangered plants
Critically endangered biota of South America